Palk may refer to:

Palk (surname)
Palk, Iran, a village in Zanjan Province, Iran
Palk Baronets
Palk Strait, a strait between India and Sri Lanka